Marshall Lee Gore (August 17, 1963 – October 1, 2013) was an American convicted murderer and rapist who was executed by the state of Florida for the 1988 murders of two women. He also raped and attempted to murder a third woman before kidnapping her 2-year-old son. Gore was convicted, sentenced to death, and subsequently executed in 2013 at Florida State Prison by lethal injection.

Early life
Gore was born on August 17, 1963, in Chicago, Illinois, and grew up in a troubled family. He was the second of five children born to Jimmy Joe Gore and Brenda McCurry Gore. His parents married in Chicago in 1961, where Gore grew up. They later moved to the Miami area. The Gore family frequently got into trouble with the law. Jimmy Joe Gore was arrested on felony charges in three states. Some of Gore's siblings were also arrested for various offenses. Gore was arrested at least eight times for multiple offenses throughout the 1980s in Miami-Dade County, Florida. His parents' marriage fell apart in 1985 due to abuse and violence, with the couple officially getting a divorce in 1987. Gore stayed with his father in Florida and worked as a bouncer at a bar his father owned.

Murders
On January 30, 1988, 19-year-old Susan Marie Roark, a Tennessee college student, disappeared. She was last seen alive with Gore leaving a trailer park in Bradley County, Tennessee. Roark phoned her grandmother and told her she was spending the night with a girlfriend in Cleveland. She said she would be home the following morning in time for church. The following day, Gore murdered her, inflicting trauma to her neck and chest. He then stole her car, a 1986 black Ford Mustang, and dumped her body off a forest road in Columbia County, Florida. On February 14, he attacked a Miami waitress, raping and stabbing her. The waitress survived the attack, and Gore abandoned the stolen Mustang in Miami, where it was found the same day.

On March 11, 30-year-old Robyn Gayle Novick, a General Motors credit services representative from Lauderhill, who was working a brief stint moonlighting as a dancer, was seen leaving the parking lot of a tavern in her yellow Corvette. She was spotted leaving with a man, who was later identified as Gore. Gore murdered Novick by stabbing her in the chest and tying a belt around her neck. He stole her car and dumped her body in a trash heap near Homestead. According to a medical examiner, the cause of death was mechanical asphyxia and stab wounds. The time of death was estimated between 9 p.m. and 1 a.m. from the late hours of March 11 to the early hours of March 12. In the early hours of March 12, Gore was spotted driving Novick's car. He abandoned the car hours later in Coral Gables, where police found it.

On March 14, Gore attacked a third woman. He abducted 32-year-old Tina Coralis, a nude dancer from Broward. He beat Coralis with a rock, raped her, choked her, stabbed her, then slit her throat with a knife. He left her for dead by the side of a road near to where he had dumped Novick's body. Gore then stole her car and drove off, abducting her 2-year-old son Jimmy, who was still sitting in the back of the vehicle.

Capture
Coralis survived the attack and alerted the police. After attacking Coralis, Gore fled the state and headed to Georgia, where he left Jimmy, locking him in the pantry of an abandoned barn before heading north towards Kentucky. On March 16, while police were searching for Jimmy, they came across the body of Novick, who was found near to where Gore had left Coralis. On March 16, Jimmy was found unharmed.

Gore was tracked to a trailer in Paducah, Kentucky. He was captured on March 17, unarmed and without incident. Near to the trailer, police found the stolen car that belonged to Coralis. After he was arrested, Gore was questioned about all three crimes. He initially denied knowing any of the women and tried claiming that he was the biological father of Jimmy. Police showed him photos of Novick's body, which caused his eyes to fill with tears. He then reportedly said, "If I did this, I deserve the death penalty."

In April 1988, Columbia County deputies found Roark's body.

Trial
At Gore's trial, he chose to represent himself. He was convicted of first-degree murder and armed robbery with a deadly weapon. The jury recommended that Gore be sentenced to death by a unanimous vote. Gore made frequent verbal outbursts during his trial and laughed out loud and howled.

In 1998, Gore won a new trial when the Supreme Court of Florida found that the prosecutor had asked him inappropriate questions during his initial trial. In 1999, following a second trial, the jury found him guilty, and he was sentenced to death again. In total, he received two death sentences, seven life sentences, and a further 110 years for his other crimes.

Execution
Gore's execution was rescheduled a total of four times in 2013 alone. He was first scheduled to be executed on June 24, but it was halted because of questions about his sanity. It was rescheduled for July, but halted again due to sanity concerns. Governor Rick Scott then rescheduled the execution for September 10, however, Florida Attorney General Pam Bondi rescheduled the execution date so she could attend a political fundraiser. She later apologized for doing so. Scott then rescheduled the execution for October 1.

On October 1, 2013, Gore was executed via lethal injection at Florida State Prison. His last meal was just a can of Coca-Cola, as he rejected his original requested last meal of sausage and pepperoni pizza. He had no final words.

See also
 Capital punishment in Florida
 Capital punishment in the United States
 List of people executed in Florida
 List of people executed in the United States in 2013
 List of serial killers in the United States

References

1963 births
2013 deaths
20th-century American criminals
21st-century executions by Florida
21st-century executions of American people
American male criminals
American people executed for murder
Criminals from Chicago
Executed people from Illinois
People convicted of murder by Florida
People executed by Florida by lethal injection